Albert Forslund (1881–1954) was a Swedish Social Democratic politician and trade union organizer. He belonged to the Swedish Railway Employees' Union. He became the chairman of the Swedish Trade Union Confederation (LO) from 1936. In the same year, he was appointed Minister of Communications (Transport), and thus left his post as LO chairman.

References

1881 births
Swedish Social Democratic Party politicians
1954 deaths
Swedish trade unionists
Swedish Ministers for Communications
Swedish Ministers for Health
20th-century Swedish politicians